Kolobrodov is a rural locality (a khutor) in Vetyutnevskoye Rural Settlement, Frolovsky District, Volgograd Oblast, Russia. The population was 217 as of 2010.

Geography 
Kolobrodov is located on Archeda River, 19 km west of Prigorodny (the district's administrative centre) by road. Shkolny is the nearest rural locality.

References 

Rural localities in Frolovsky District